The Anthem of the Chukotka Autonomous Okrug is one of the national symbols of Chukotka Autonomous Okrug, a federal subject of Russia, along with its flag and coat of arms. The anthem was written and composed by K.N. Kelena-Zorina, both in 2000. It was officially adopted on 4 October 2000.

Lyrics

References

Russian anthems
Regional songs
Asian anthems
Chukotka Autonomous Okrug
National anthem compositions in F major